Neville Lancelot Goddard (February 19, 1905October 1, 1972), generally known as Neville Goddard, was a Barbadian New Thought author and mystic who wrote on the Bible, esotericism and is considered to be one of the pioneers of the "law of assumption".

Early life 
Goddard was born in Barbados on February 19, 1905, to Joseph Nathaniel and Wilhelmina Goddard. He emigrated to New York City , where he initially worked as a ballet and ballroom dancer. 

In 1931, he began to study under an Ethiopian rabbi named Abdullah, who introduced him to Kabbalah. When in 1942 at the age of 38 he was drafted into the army and stationed at Camp Polk Louisiana in the 11th Armoured Division.  After serving just 9 months he was granted an honourable discharge from his Battalion Commanding Officer Colonel Theodore Bilbough Jr.  It was after this brief stint in the  Army that he was naturalised as a United States citizen.

Career
He was a dancer, and to some extent, an actor. He states in Consciousness is the Only Reality: "For ten years I was a dancer, dancing in Broadway shows, in vaudeville, night clubs, and in Europe."  In early 1950s, Goddard lectured at The Town Hall on religious topics. He made mention in his 1931 lecture imagination plus faith of his brief career in television, “I did just what I am doing now, they gave me a lectern, I simply sat at a desk and spoke”.  It was during the mid-1950’s that he began his short stint on television.  Broadcast in L.A. on channel 11 he had 26 half hour shows which went on air between 2pm and 2.30pm every Sunday.  The shows where very simple in production, Goddard would just speak extemporaneously on biblical esotericism, in front of a camera. It was a tremendous success at the time with viewing audiences in excess of 300,000 every week.  Unfortunately, channel 11 studios where unable to secure advertisers suitable to the audience so the show was eventually cancelled. In 1954, he was reportedly planning a "metaphysical telefilm show", though it is unclear if the project came to fruition.

Views 
Goddard viewed the Bible as a parable of the human psyche as opposed to a record of historical events and it has to be interpreted as guidebook to enlightenment and personal power. Therefore, Goddard did not believe in an external God who answers prayers, but rather that every human being is God individualized as that person, "you are the creator".

Neville's lectures regularly referenced scriptures of the Bible, as nonsecular history, and asserted that scripture tells us that  "everyone is yourself pushed out", we are all God pushed out, “it’s all God”, clarifying the fact that only God exists and everything else is an externalzation of God, an external expression of God manifested in the objective world. God is pure imagination, and as scripture tells us, his name for all eternity is “I am”. The whole vast objective world is manifested purely from human beings, God, “I am”, imagining whatever it imagines, as scripture tells us, bringing it all forth from the unseen to the seen — Hebrews 11:1 “Now faith is the assurance of things hoped for, the conviction of things not seen.” Goddard taught that by awakening to this truth, people could manifest their own objective reality by assuming the "feeling of the wish fulfilled", hence, “imagining and feeling ‘what would it be like IF the dream was already fulfilled’”, or “feeling the wish fulfilled from the assumption that you already have it, you already are the person you wish to be“, which is referred as "the law of assumption" — faith. 

The author also believed that one can only experience “death” if they are not yet awakened to the fact that they are the Christ (“the wisdom and the power of God”), and God himself (“pure love, pure energy”), as described in the scriptures of the Bible—“God and I are one.” The individual must, through vision, experience the birth of Christ from within themselves as described in his books and told in his lectures, and as told to us through scripture. Again, the Bible is not secular history but rather that the whole drama of the Bible is a spiritual drama that takes place in all human beings, written as parables. One who has yet to experience this birth from within would be "restored" in a similar life in a world just like this one, perhaps in a similar way to the Nietzschean version of the concept of the eternal return, until they experienced this birth of Christ from within, the experience referred to in scripture as "God's Promise". Once one has experienced this birth, this promise, they can no longer experience “death” — the death which leads to restoration and continuance of a human experience in a world similar to this one. After the experience of Christ’s birth from within, a person experiences a physical death only one more time, at which time they energetically meld with the “I AM” oneness of God as pure energy, pure spirit, pure love, although still individualized, but never again to experience physical form. One biblical reference to this is in the parable written as: Jeremiah 24:7 KJV—“And I will give them an heart to know me, that I am the LORD: and they shall be my people, and I will be their God: for they shall return unto me with their whole heart.”

Legacy 
Jonathan L. Walton argues that Frederick Eikerenkoetter, in particular, adopted theories on people's ability to change their situation through "feeling" that are rooted in Goddard's ideas. Rhonda Byrne and Wayne Dyer have noted that Goddard shaped their views. Margaret Runyan Castaneda, ex-wife and later biographer of Carlos Castaneda, was interested in Goddard's work and introduced Carlos to Goddard's ideas.

In 2015, books by Neville Goddard including "Feeling Is The Secret", "At Your Command" and "Out of This World" were released as audiobooks, narrated by Hillary Hawkins.

Goddard was influenced by writer William Blake and early self-help theorists Émile Coué and Thomson Jay Hudson.

Death
Goddard died on October 1, 1972, aged 67, from a brain aneurysm. He had been a resident of Los Angeles for roughly 20 years.

He is buried in Westbury Cemetery, Saint Michael, Barbados.

Works 
 At Your Command (1939)
 Your Faith Is Your Fortune (1941)
 Freedom for All—A Practical Application of the Bible (1942)
 Feeling Is the Secret (1944)
 Prayer—The Art of Believing (1946)
 Out of This World (1949)
 The Creative Use of Imagination (1952)
 The Power of Awareness (1952)
 Awakened Imagination (1954)
 Seedtime and Harvest (1956)
 I Know My Father (1960)
 The Law and the Promise (1961)

References

Sources

Further reading 
  A 1943 profile of Goddard.
 Neville Goddard Original Audio Lectures 001 A-F

1905 births
1972 deaths
American writers
American people of Barbadian descent